Michael S. Morris, is a physics professor at Butler University. He earned a PhD in physics from Caltech under the supervision of Kip Thorne. Among his nine published peer-reviewed papers, his most notable theoretical contribution is his pioneering analysis of time travel through traversable wormholes, coauthored in 1987 with Kip Thorne, and Ulvi Yurtsever. Kip Thorne tells the story of this discovery in his 1995 book Black Holes and Time Warps: Einstein's Outrageous Legacy.

Publications
 

  (A tutorial paper)

See also
 Roman arch

References

External links
Mike Morris' Usenet traces posted as msmorris@netdirect.net (via Google Groups)
Mike Morris' Usenet traces posted as msmorris@watsci.uwaterloo.ca (via Google Groups)

California Institute of Technology alumni
Usenet people
Homeschooling advocates
Living people
Year of birth missing (living people)